Baker McKenzie is an international law firm located in Chicago, Illinois. It was founded in 1949, originally named Baker & McKenzie. It now has 77 offices in 46 countries and employs 4,809 attorneys and approximately 13,000 employees. The firm took in $3,126,729,000 gross revenue in 2021, thus placing 4th on The American Lawyers 2022 Am Law 200 ranking.

History 

Co-founding partner Russell Baker, born in Wisconsin and raised in New Mexico, opened his early practice, Baker & Simpson, in Chicago in 1925, following his graduation from the University of Chicago Law School. Baker had early exposure to the Spanish language and other cultures, and his firm provided legal services to Chicago's growing Mexican American community. The firm later advised U.S. companies investing in Latin America.

In 1949, the firm relaunched with John McKenzie, a litigator who had graduated from Loyola University Chicago School of Law, who took charge of the litigation practice, as Baker built an international practice.

Baker McKenzie became an international firm beginning in 1955, when a lawyer in Venezuela contacted Baker McKenzie about opening a joint venture office in Caracas. Russell Baker's son, Donald, moved to Caracas to launch the satellite office. Within the next three years, offices were opened in Washington, D.C., Amsterdam, Brussels, Zurich, New York and São Paulo. By 1978, Baker McKenzie had 26 offices in 20 countries. By 1990, the firm operated 49 offices on six continents, employing around 1500 attorneys, and generating $400 million in revenues. In October 2006, Unilever chose the firm to manage its global trademark portfolio, the largest in the world, with over 160,000 registrations, marking the first time a multinational company outsourced its trademark management to a law firm on such a large scale. In July 2013, co-founding partner Russell Baker was named one of American Lawyer'''s top 50 innovators for pioneering ideas and initiatives that changed the world of BigLaw.

In 1999, Christine Lagarde, the Paris managing partner and an antitrust and labor lawyer, was elected chair of the global executive committee, the first woman to lead Baker McKenzie or any major international law firm; she was chair for five years. She later became France's Minister of Finance and managing director of the International Monetary Fund.

In 2001, the firm employed 3,000 attorneys and garnered $1 billion in revenues. In 2005, 70 partners, and other legal staff, from the New York office of disbanding international firm Coudert Brothers joined Baker McKenzie.

In August 2014, Baker McKenzie revealed it was the first law firm to break through the $2.5bn revenues barrier since the financial crisis, and that it was also the largest firm in the world by headcount.

The firm's global chair, from 2016, until his death in April 2019, was former London managing partner Paul Rawlinson, who was the 15th chair, and the first British chair of the firm. Rawlinson had succeeded Eduardo C. Leite who was chair of Baker McKenzie from 2010 to 2016. In September 2019 the Firm announced that Milton Cheng had been elected as the global chair for four years, commenced October 2019.

Baker McKenzie is organized as a Swiss Verein which allows regional profit pools and their related tax, accounting and partner compensation systems to remain separate while allowing strategy, branding, information technology and other core functions to be shared between the constituent partnerships. Baker McKenzie is the only Verein that used to be a single partnership. All of the other Vereins were created by firms merging.

After 40 years of existence in the UAE, Baker McKenzie announced to swiftly separate from its Emirati partner, Habib Al Mulla. In September 2022, the law firm raised a concern regarding the homophobic Twitter posts by Mulla, whose firm merged with Baker McKenzie in 2013. Mulla sparked controversy when he described homosexuality as “ugly” in his tweets. Baker McKenzie’s head of investigations Borys Dackiw was temporarily appointed to lead. The law firm said it wanted to “ensure and inclusive work environment for all”.

 Controversies 
According to the ICIJ, Baker McKenzie has a history of working with "notorious fraudsters and autocratic regimes."

In 1986, Geoffrey Bowers, then a New York attorney, filed a complaint with the New York State Division of Human Rights, charging that he had been fired from his job at the Manhattan branch of Baker McKenzie law firm after AIDS-related lesions appeared on his face. The firm maintained that he was fired purely for his performance. Two months after testifying at a hearing on the complaint, he died at age 33. The case was resolved in his favor in late December, when Baker McKenzie was ordered to pay $500,000 to Bowers' estate. It was one of the first AIDS discrimination cases to go to a public hearing. Baker McKenzie appealed but subsequently withdrew the appeal after they negotiated a confidential settlement in 1995 with Bowers' family forbidding parties from ever discussing the case or the terms of the agreement. These events were one inspiration for the film Philadelphia, starring Tom Hanks and Denzel Washington (the script of which was derived from numerous sources). The film's credits include the following message: "This motion picture was inspired in part by Geoffrey Bowers’ AIDS discrimination lawsuit, the courage and love of the Angius family and the struggles of the many others who, along with their loved ones, have experienced discrimination because of AIDS."

In 1994, in a seminal case, a legal secretary, Rena Weeks, successfully sued the law firm for sexual harassment. The trial court ordered the law firm to pay $6.9 million in punitive damages, making it one of the largest damage awards in history for this type of action. On May 4, 1998, the California Court of Appeal for the First District upheld the trial court's judgment in full, and the Supreme Court of California denied review. A subsequent dispute among Weeks' victorious attorneys as to the division of fees among them (she had signed a contingent fee agreement for 40% of her recovery) did reach the Supreme Court of California in 2002; the court held that the later-associated co-counsel could not recover the full amount he sought because Weeks' attorneys had not obtained her consent to an agreement to split fees among co-counsel from different firms as required by California court rules. Martin R. Greenstein, the partner whose actions resulted in Weeks' successful lawsuit, was given a public reproval by the State Bar of California on March 26, 1998, and for obvious reasons, is no longer with Baker McKenzie (the Court of Appeal decision noted that he was terminated by the firm in August 1993).

 Tax avoidance 
In 2021, the law firm was listed in the Pandora Papers after the law firm conducted offshoring activities for organizations outside of the United States. One of the actions include setting up shell companies in Cyprus for RJR Nabisco (which as split up), creating a tax shelter for Nike, as well as moving Facebook's tax headquarters to Ireland, allowing these companies to avoid taxes. Baker McKenzie's clients include Malaysian fugitive Jho Low.

Baker McKenzie has boasted about helping to set up tax free zones in the UAE, which critics say encourage illicit activity. Baker McKenzie has lobbied against legislation to curb offshore tax avoidance by big companies and lobbied against legislation that would increase due diligence for foreign customers of American banks.

According to the ICIJ, Baker McKenzie is "an architect of the modern tax avoidance system." The company has helped fraudsters, corrupt officials and elites in authoritarian regimes avoid taxes and hide wealth through the use of shell companies, trusts and complex structures in tax havens. The Pandora Papers mentioned Baker McKenzie more than any other major U.S. law firm – the leaks alone revealed that Baker McKenzie was involved in setting up more than 440 offshore companies registered in tax havens.

 Russia 
Baker McKenzie has described itself as the "go-to firm for Russia’s largest companies and major foreign investors."

Baker McKenzie has represented Russian state-owned companies Gazprom, Sberbank, VTB Bank, VEB.RF and Sviaz Bank, and the arms-manufacturer Rostec. In October 2021, the Pandora Papers leaks revealed that company represented at least six sanctioned Russian companies. After Russia invaded Ukraine in February 2022, the company initially did not sever ties with Russian state-owned companies, but said it was "reviewing and adjusting our Russia-related operations and client work" to adjust to sanctions. In late March 2022, the company said it was leaving Russia.

In 2016, Baker McKenzie worked for Rostec in selling shares in a Mongolian copper mine. The sale triggered a corruption investigation.

In 2021, Baker McKenzie advised the Russian ministry of finance on a $1.8 billion bond deal.

Ranking
For the last seven years Thomson Reuters has ranked Baker McKenzie number one in the world by number of cross-border deals — more than 65% of the firm's deals are cross-border — and for the eleventh year in a row the firm was ranked first for deals with emerging market involvement, by both number of announced and completed number of deals.

, it is ranked as the second-largest international law firm in the world by headcount with 13,000 employees including 6,076 fee earners and 4,700 lawyers on a full-time equivalent basis in 78 offices across 47 countries. It is the largest law firm in the United States by headcount. It is also ranked as the third largest law firm in the world in terms of revenue with US$2.89 billion  in annual revenue in FY2018. It is the largest international law firm in Asia Pacific, Continental Europe and Latin America. In December 2016 and as part of a major visual identity change, Baker & McKenzie re-branded and dropped the '&' from its name to become Baker McKenzie.

Notable matters and transactions
In 2006, Baker McKenzie wrote the amicus brief of the Council of Parent Attorneys & Advocates (COPAA) in support of the petition for a Writ of Certiorari in Winkelman v. Parma City School District, and later, COPAA's amicus brief on the merits. It argued that parents have the right to represent themselves in court to enforce their IDEA rights and protect their children's access to a free appropriate public education. This led to a unanimous Supreme Court decision in June 2007 granting parents the right to proceed without counsel on behalf of children with disabilities.

In December 2009, Baker McKenzie won a landmark tax case against the U.S. Internal Revenue Service for Symantec Corporation.  The IRS had claimed that the Veritas Software Corporation, which Symantec had subsequently acquired in 2005, owed over $1 billion in back taxes, penalties and interest as a result of Veritas' non-U.S. operations.  Symantec took the case to the U.S. Tax Court where Baker & McKenzie argued that the IRS position was arbitrary, capricious and unreasonable.  In an opinion by Judge Maurice Foley, the court decided in favor of Symantec.

Baker McKenzie represented Microsoft in Microsoft Corporation v. Internal Revenue Service''

In 2012, Baker McKenzie helped overturn Paul Chambers' conviction under the Communications Act of 2003 (the Twitter Joke Trial) for tweeting a "message of a menacing character." Chambers, an accountant, had tweeted a "silly joke" about "blowing up the Robin Hood airport in South Yorkshire." The team advising on his appeal was led by Preiskel & Co's David Allen Green, John Cooper QC of 25 Bedford Row and Sarah Przybylska of 2 Hare Court. The Baker McKenzie team, which acted on the case pro bono from 2010, included partners Harry Small, Tom Cassels and Ben Allgrove.

Baker McKenzie is currently representing Facebook Inc. in its dispute with the IRS over the value of assets the company transferred to its Irish holding company. Lawyers with the U.S. Department of Justice asked for a court order forcing Facebook to provide information to the IRS related to agreements between the company and the holding company, Facebook Ireland Holdings.

References

External links

Law firms established in 1949
Law firms based in Chicago
Privately held companies of the United States
Foreign law firms with offices in Hong Kong
Foreign law firms with offices in Japan
Foreign law firms with offices in the Netherlands
1949 establishments in Illinois